As of 2015, the Japanese language has two translations available of the Tirukkural.

History
The first Japanese translation of the Kural text was made by Shuzo Matsunaga in 1981, who also translated it into Korean. The second translation was made by Takanobu Takahashi in 1999 titled Thirukkural: Sacred Verses of Ancient Tamil (ティルックラル: ティルヴァッルヴァル＝著 高橋孝信＝訳). 南インドのタミル地方で，今もなお誰もが口にする1300余の箴言。６世紀頃につくられ，法・財・愛をテーマにインド的思考を結晶させた聖なる短詩 (ティルックラル) を，詳細な注釈で読み解く) and was published by Heibonsha, Tokyo.

See also
 Tirukkural translations
 List of Tirukkural translations by language

References

External links
 </ref>

Japanese
Translations into Japanese